Carl Quince "Quincy" Armstrong Jr. (November 22, 1928 – November 2, 2020) was a professional American football Center who played for the Cleveland Browns in 1954. He was born in Clyde, Texas. Armstrong began his professional football career in Canada with the Hamilton Tiger-Cats. He played for two seasons and won a Grey Cup championship in 1953. He finished his football days with the Ottawa Rough Riders in 1955.

References

External links
Pro-Football-Reference

1928 births
2020 deaths
American football centers
Canadian football centres
American players of Canadian football
Cleveland Browns players
People from Callahan County, Texas
Hamilton Tiger-Cats players
Ottawa Rough Riders players
Players of American football from Texas
Players of Canadian football from Texas